James Davenport may refer to:

James H. Davenport (born 1953), professor of information technology at the University of Bath
James Davenport (clergyman) (1716–1757), American clergyman from Connecticut
James Davenport (Connecticut politician) (1758–1797), American lawyer, U.S. Congressman from Connecticut
Jim Davenport (journalist) (1958–2012), American journalist with the Associated Press based in South Carolina
James S. Davenport (1864–1940), American lawyer, U.S. Congressman from Oklahoma
Jim Davenport (1933–2016), baseball player
Kenny Davenport (James Kenyon Davenport, 1862–1908), English international footballer
James Potter Davenport (1841–1905), Los Angeles, California, City Council member who was the first official in the United States to be removed from office in a recall election
James C. Davenport (born 1938), physicist and one of the founders of the National Society of Black Physicists